A 4-poster or four poster automotive test system is specifically designed for the testing of vehicles (cars, trucks). These test systems consist of 4 hydraulic actuators on top of which the wheels of the vehicle are placed. Movements of the actuators simulate the road surface and forces exerted by the road on the wheels. The movements of the system are tightly controlled by a digital test controller. During the research phase of a vehicle a 4-poster system is used to test newly designed suspension systems and their durability. In production 4-poster systems are usually used to test every vehicle at the end of the production line on squeak and rattle, which is a check to make sure the vehicle doesn't have any loose parts. Different kinds of testing are possible: sine test (sweep in frequency); simple wave form on each actuator; open loop test (driven by an external tension signal); a particular testing method called ICS control, which allows to reproduce on a car an actual service environment, starting from those data coming from the outdoor acquisition sessions.

See also
 7 post shaker

Reference 

Automotive engineering